Allen  Christian Roberts (16 December 1922 – 6 September 2015) was a New Zealand cricketer. He played two first-class matches for Auckland in 1947/48.

See also
 List of Auckland representative cricketers

References

External links
 

1922 births
2015 deaths
New Zealand cricketers
Auckland cricketers
Cricketers from Auckland
New Zealand Services cricketers